Thomandersia anachoreta is a small tree or shrub native to tropical rain forest of southwestern Côte d'Ivoire.

Lamiales
Flora of Ivory Coast